Rear Admiral (United States) Thomas Kenneth Shannon (USN) (born 1960) is a retired naval officer. His final assignment was as commander of the US Navy Military Sealift Command.

Education
Shannon graduated with a BS in Nautical Science from the Maine Maritime Academy (1982) and was commissioned an ensign in the US Navy through the Naval Reserve Officers Training Corps program. He later received an MA in National Security and Strategic Studies from the Naval War College in March 1998.

Career
Shannon was then in the year 2012 promoted from the rank of rear admiral (lower half) to rear admiral, before being relieved of command of Carrier Strike Group 1 and named commander, Military Sealift Command in the year 2013. He completed this assignment on 25 August 2016 when he was relieved by Rear Adm. Dee L. Mewbourne and subsequently retired from the navy.

Medals and decorations
Among the rear admiral's military decorations and awards are prominently:

References

External links

1960 births
Living people
Place of birth missing (living people)
Maine Maritime Academy alumni
Naval War College alumni
Recipients of the Meritorious Service Medal (United States)
Recipients of the Legion of Merit
United States Navy admirals
Recipients of the Defense Superior Service Medal